Jan Černý (4 March 1874, in Uherský Ostroh, Moravia, Austria-Hungary – 10 April 1959, in Uherský Ostroh, Czechoslovakia) was a Czechoslovak civil servant and politician. He was the prime minister of Czechoslovakia from 1920 to 1921 and in 1926. He also served as the provincial president (governor) of Moravia in 1918–1920, 1921–1928 and 1929–1939.

Jan Černý was born into a furriers family in the small town of Uherský Ostroh, in the east of Moravia (Moravian Slovakia). He attended the gymnasium  (a grammar school) in Uherské Hradiště from 1885 to 1893. After studies at the Faculty of Law of Charles University in Prague – he graduated in 1898 – he began professional career as a state servant (county director) in Hodonín. From 1912 he was a senior department director in the Moravian governor's office (stadtholder government). At the time of the revolutionary establishment of Czechoslovakia, being the highest-ranked Czech-speaking imperial state servant in Moravia, he became the head of the local government for the new state on 29 November 1918.

References

Further reading
Brügel, Johann Wolfgang (1967). Tschechen und Deutsche (in German), Munich, Nyphenbureger. p. 104

External links
Biography 

1874 births
1959 deaths
People from Uherský Ostroh
People from the Margraviate of Moravia
Prime Ministers of Czechoslovakia
Charles University alumni
Austro-Hungarian people